A Unicast advertisement is an Internet advertisement that consists of a video played like a TV commercial, usually in a pop-up or pop-under advertisement. Unicast ads have the same influence and power as a regular TV commercial, except they allow the viewer to click on the ad in order to go to the company's website, or get more information.

References

Online advertising